The University of Maryland School of Nursing Living History Museum is located in Baltimore, Maryland, United States, and is dedicated to sharing the rich history and heritage of the nursing profession. The Museum features hundreds of original objects and photographs, as well as compelling audio and video presentations.  The Museum traces the evolution of the School of Nursing’s mission in nursing education, research and practice from its early years as a hospital training school to its emergence as a premier professional school.

The Museum highlights the rarely acknowledged historical contributions of nurses, challenges widespread myths and misconceptions about nursing, and explores the contemporary role of nurses as health care providers. It is an opportunity for visitors to encounter—many for the first time—the untold story of American nursing through the experiences of University of Maryland nurses from the School’s founding in 1889 to the present.

The University of Maryland School of Nursing Living History Museum is located at 655 W. Lombard Street, Baltimore, MD 21201, just a short walk from Baltimore's Inner Harbor. The Museum is open Tuesday and Wednesday during academic terms from 10:00 a.m. - 2:00 p.m., and by arrangement at other times.

References

External links 
 The University of Maryland School of Nursing Museum Website
 Volunteering at the Living History Museum
 American Association for the History of Nursing, Inc.

Nursing museums
Nursing Living History Museum
Nursing Living History Museum
School of Nursing Living History Museum
School of Nursing Living History Museum
Medical museums in Maryland